The University of The Bahamas (UB) is the national public institution of higher education in the Commonwealth of The Bahamas with campuses throughout the archipelago. The main campus is located in the capital city of Nassau, on the island of New Providence.

After more than thirty-five years of serving The Bahamas, first as a two-year institution, then as a four-year degree-granting College, the University of The Bahamas was chartered on November 10, 2016.

Overview 
The University of The Bahamas has about 5,000 students and over 12,000 alumni. It is one of the largest employers in The Bahamas, employing 700 faculty and staff.  Seventy-six percent of the over 300 faculty (261 full-time and 96 part-time) are Bahamian.

Chartered on 10th November 2016, University of The Bahamas (UB) is a beacon for national transformation in The Bahamas. Approximately 5,000 students are enrolled in the University of The Bahamas system which includes campuses and centres on New Providence, Grand Bahama, and San Salvado , as well as UB online education.   UB’s diverse academic programmes, research engagements, athletics and leadership development experiences equip our students to become global  citizens in a dynamic world (www.ub.edu.bs).

The College of The Bahamas (COB) was the pre-cursor to the University of The Bahamas.  COB was established in 1974 by an act of the Parliament of The Bahamas, the College of the Bahamas (COB) was created through the merger of:

 The Bahamas Teachers' College
 The San Salvador Teachers' College,
 The C. R. Walker Technical College - named for mathematics teacher Claudius Roland Walker
 The Sixth Form Programme of the Government High School.

Campuses 
 The college has three academic campuses and several teaching and academic research centres throughout The Bahamas.  The Oakes Field and Grosvenor Close Campus, housing the Division of Nursing and Health Sciences, are both in Nassau. The Northern Campus is near Freeport on Grand Bahama.

The Northern Campus opened in 2011 as part of a planned university community 10 kilometers east of Port Lucaya and 15 kilometers east of Freeport. Operating initially with only the first two buildings, the campus will feature classrooms, faculty offices, library, computer and science labs, bookstore, cafeteria, conference room and administrative offices. Future development includes signature buildings, student and faculty housing, specialized instructional, academic and office spaces, commercial and dining spaces and athletic facilities.

New facilities on New Providence are planned for:

 The Small Island Sustainability Centre, housing multidisciplinary sustainability programs focusing on issues unique to small island economies
 The Franklyn Wilson Graduate Business Centre, housing The Faculty of Business, including both graduate and undergraduate Schools of Business

Satellite campuses serve students throughout the archipelago in Abaco, Andros, Exuma and San Salvador.

The college opened an agricultural location in Andros in 2014.

Institutes and Research Centres 
The University's academic and outreach centres include:

 The Centre for Continuing Education and Extension Services
 The Abaco Center
 The Exuma Center
 The COB/Cape Eleuthera Institute
 Oral History Institute
 Confucius Institute
 Agricultural and Marine Science Institute (2014)

Research Centers include:
 
 The Gerace Research Centre for the Study of Archaeology, Biology, Geology and Marine Science is located on the shores of Graham's Harbour on the north end of San Salvador Island. The centre (formerly The Bahamian Field Station) is used as a base camp for over 10,000 annual scientific researcher and student expeditions. The centre is currently run by Dr. Troy A. Dexter.
 The Bahamas Environmental Research Centre (BERC), located in central Andros, opened in 1995 as a collaborative effort with George Mason University in Virginia and the people of Andros. The BERC's primary objective is to promote an understanding of current ecological issues.
 The Marine and Environmental Studies Institute (MESI) is a multi-disciplinary research unit meeting national needs in scientific and technical research and community health. The institute was designed to build the nation's capacity for research, monitor marine and environmental resources and provide policy options for natural resource management. MESI partners with government ministries and international research institutions, provides leadership in program development in small island sustainability and provides year-round access to the unique sub-tropical ecosystems of the coastal, coral reefs, mangrove and sea grass communities in The Bahamas.
 As part of a Sustainable Science Initiative (SSI), the Poultry Research Unit carries out research and training on sustainable tropical island agriculture and supports collaboration with counterparts with similar research foci and funding.  The first phase was completed in 2004 with funding from the Freedom Foundation. The initiative is located on a  site southwest of the Oakes Field Campus at the Gladstone Road Agricultural Centre in New Providence.

Harry C. Moore Library 

Opened in 2011, the  Harry C. Moore Library includes the law library, a 24-hour-a-day computer commons, auditorium, classrooms, media production studio, individual and group study spaces, institutional archives and exhibition spaces. The historical archives will serve as the de facto national library of The Bahamas, including the personal papers of Bahamian prime ministers. The library is named for American born Bahamian philanthropist Harry C. Moore (1913-2003).

Organization 
The university is governed by the Council of the University of The Bahamas, chaired by Alfred Sears. The day-to-day operations are overseen by the president, who is appointed by the Council.

Senior administration 
Key administrative personnel include:
 President, Dr. Erik Rolland
 Provost/Vice President Academic Affairs, Dr. Maria Woodside-Oriakhi
 Executive Vice President, and President of the Northern Bahamas Campus, Dr. Ian Strachan
 Vice President for Operations, Mr. Ronnie Stevenson
 Vice President of Finance, Mr. Allington Hunter
 Vice President of Student Affairs, Mr. Joe Stubbs
 Vice President Institutional Advancement & Alumni Affairs, Mr. Dino Hernandez
 Vice President or Administrative Services, Dr. Marcella Elliott-Ferguson
 Vice President of Human Resources, Dr. VOchelle Ferguson

Presidents 
The University of The Bahamas typically appoints presidents to three-year terms and has had eight presidents in fifteen years.
 Dr. Erik Rolland (2022–present)
 Dr. Rodney D. Smith (2014-2022)
 Dr. Earla Carey-Baines (2014)
 Dr. Betsy Boze (2011–2013)
 Dr. Earla Carey-Baines (2010)
 Ms. Janyne Hodder (2006–2010)
 Dr. Rhonda Chipman Johnson (2005-2006)
 Dr. Rodney Smith (2004–2005)
 Dr. Rhonda Chipman Johnson (2004)
 Dr. Leon Higgs (1998–2004)
 Dr. Keva Bethel (1996–1998)

Principals 
 Dr. Keva Bethel (1982-1995)
 Dr. Jacob Bynoe (1979-1981)
 Dr. Kazim Bacchus (1976-1978)
 Dr. John Knowles (1974-1976)

Controversy 

Some of the members of the University of Bahama's Administration and Board of Trustees, which are in entrusted with the care of the management of university affairs, have a “chequered” past. The current President, Rodney Smith, was fired from the same institution in 2005 for using “another academic's material without attribution” (plagiarism) during a student Convocation. This 2005 incident of Smith's was so shocking that the then-Chairman of the Council Franklyn Wilson said that it would be a “significant error for the country” if Smith was reappointed during an institutional presidential search in 2014. One of the defenders of Smith's reappointment, former Bahamian Supreme Court Justice and current member of the Board of Trustees Ruby Nottage, claimed that the appointment process was transparent, open to public inquiry, and impartial. However, Ruby Nottage herself is not free from controversy. In 1986, she and her husband were indicted by a Boston grand jury of money laundering for a notorious Boston gangster.

Academics 
The university offers certificates and diplomas as well as associate, baccalaureate and master's degrees for 66 majors and serves over 5,000 students. In 2011, 66 percent of the graduates earned baccalaureate degrees, reflecting the change in student demand and the emergence of institution from college to university. Over 80% of entering students enroll in baccalaureate and masters programs. Pharmacy, law and other advanced professional degree programs are offered in partnership with Caribbean and U.S. universities.

UB offers degrees through eight academic units, including an institute and seven schools. Six of the schools are organized into faculties (equivalent to colleges in U.S. universities) headed by an academic dean.

The Academic Faculties (equivalent to Colleges) and their related schools are:
 Faculty of Business
 School of Business
 Faculty of Liberal and Fine Arts
 School of Communication and Creative Arts
 School of English Studies
 Faculty of Pure and Applied Sciences
 School of Chemistry, Environmental and Life Sciences
 School of Nursing and Allied Health
 School of Mathematics, Physics and Technology
 Faculty of Social and Educational Studies
 School of Education
 School of Social Sciences
 International Languages and Cultures Institute
 Culinary and Hospitality Management Institute

Athletics

The Mingoes, as the University's athletes are known, compete nationally and internationally.

References

External links

University of The Bahamas Digital Collection hosted in the Digital Library of the Caribbean

Universities in The Bahamas
Educational institutions established in 1974
1974 establishments in the Bahamas